Li Jingtian (born January 1948) is a Chinese retired politician of Manchu heritage. Between 2007 and 2013, he served as the executive vice president of the Central Party School. He served as Chairpersons of the Ethnic Affairs Committee of the National People's Congress.

Biography
Born in Jalaid Banner, Inner Mongolia, Li joined the Communist Party of China in February, 1971. From 1968, he served in Nenjiang County of Heilongjiang Province and was the secretary of the Communist Youth League Nengjiang committee. In 1976, Li was elevated to vice secretary and later, secretary of CYL Heihe committee. He entered the Central Organization Department of the Communist Party of China in 1978, and in 1995, he was promoted to director of organization bureau of the Department. In 1998, Li was transferred to Shanxi Province and became a standing committee member and director of organization department of CPC Shanxi committee. He was later promoted to vice Party chief of Shanxi. In 2001, Li was transferred back to the Central Organization Department and served as vice director. In 2005, he became the director of research office of Party history of the CPC. By the end of 2007, Li was appointed as the executive vice president of CPC Central Party School (rank equivalent of minister). He left the post in 2013.

Li was an alternate member of the 16th and 17th Central Committees of the Communist Party of China.

References

1948 births
People's Republic of China politicians from Inner Mongolia
Living people
Manchu politicians
People from Hinggan League
Chinese Communist Party politicians from Inner Mongolia
Political office-holders in Heilongjiang
Political office-holders in Shanxi
Deputy Communist Party secretaries of Shanxi
Chairpersons of the National People's Congress Ethnic Affairs Committee